The 2009–10 LNBP was the 10th season of the Liga Nacional de Baloncesto Profesional, one of the professional basketball leagues of Mexico. It started on September 10, 2009 and ended on March 10, 2010. The league title was won by Halcones UV Xalapa, which defeated Halcones Rojos Veracruz in the championship series, 4–1.

Format 
20 teams participate. The format was changed for this season: instead of having 2 groups, all the teams played against each other and the standings included all 20 teams with no separation in groups. The first 16 teams qualify for the playoffs. The playoffs have eighth-finals (best-of-5), quarterfinals (best-of-5), semifinals (best-of-7) and finals (best-of-7).

Teams

Regular season

Standings

Playoffs

References

External links 
 2009–10 LNBP season on Latinbasket.com

LNBP seasons
2009 in Mexican sports
2010 in Mexican sports
2009–10 in North American basketball